Tusbab Stallions are a professional football club established in 2019 and based in Madang, Papua New Guinea.

The club most debuted in the 2019–20 Papua New Guinea National Soccer League.

History 
The club was established in 2019 as successor of an amateur club dating back to 2004 of the same name, which itself was founded after a merge between two separate Madang-based clubs, Tusbab and Blue Kumuls. The amateur side had won the Madang Soccer Association Grand Final in 2018, prior to their move to semi-professional status.

On 11 January 2019, the side was confirmed as one of the sides entered into the 2019 National Soccer League, and had been drawn into the Northern Conference. They won their opening fixture with a 1–0 victory over Laiwaden FC. By the halfway stage of the season, the side sat fifth out of eight sides in the conference, having won two games and drawn one.

The second half of their season was poor, with the side picking up just one more point, a 1–1 draw with Laiwaden, before five consecutive defeats saw them finish at the bottom of the conference.

They entered the 2019–20 season and started strongly, winning five of their opening nine games thanks to eight goals from Stahl Gubag. However, following Gubag and central defender Nigel Malagian's mid-season transfers to Lae City, the side began to struggle, failing to win in seven games before a 2–1 victory over playoff rivals Gulf Komara looked like it might stabilise their playoff push. However, a draw and a defeat in their final two games saw them slip to sixth on the final day.

Domestic record

National competitions 

 Papua New Guinea National Soccer League
2019: Northern Conference: 8th
2019–20: 6th

Players

Current squad
Squad for 2019–20 Papua New Guinea National Soccer League

Club officials

Management

Coaching staff

References 

Football clubs in Papua New Guinea
Association football clubs established in 2019
2019 establishments in Papua New Guinea